End as a Man may refer to:

 The 1947 novel End as a Man by Calder Willingham
 The 1957 film End as a Man based on that novel and better known as The Strange One